Stenoptilia himachala is a moth of the family Pterophoridae. It is found in Himachal Pradesh, India.

The wingspan is 14–20 mm.

References

Moths described in 1999
himachala
Moths of Asia